Wang Chuqin (simplified Chinese: 王楚钦; born 11 May 2000) is a Chinese table tennis player. He won gold in the men's singles and mixed team events at the 2018 Youth Olympic Games in Buenos Aires, Argentina. He also won gold along with teammates Fan Zhendong, Ma Long, Liang Jingkun and Lin Gaoyuan at the 2022 World Team Table Tennis Championships in Chengdu.

Career

2021 
In May, Wang was selected as an alternate for the Chinese National Team at the Tokyo Olympics. Wang reached the semi-finals of the second leg of the Chinese Olympic Scrimmage before losing to eventual champion Fan Zhendong 4–2.

In September, Wang lost to Liu Dingshuo in the semi-finals of the China National Games and then lost to Liang Jingkun in the bronze-medal match.

On November 29, 2021, Wang paired with Sun Yingsha won the gold medal in the mixed double finals at the 2021 World Table Tennis Championships.

2022

On 23 October 2022, Wang defeated Fan Zhendong in the final at the WTT Champions Macao 2022.

At the WTT Cup Finals in Xinxiang, Wang won against Dang Qiu in the quarterfinals, before going on to win against Ma Long in the semi-finals and Tomokazu Harimoto in the final.

Singles titles

References

External links

Chinese male table tennis players
2000 births
Living people
Table tennis players from Jilin
Asian Games medalists in table tennis
Table tennis players at the 2018 Asian Games
Asian Games gold medalists for China
Medalists at the 2018 Asian Games
World Table Tennis Championships medalists
Youth Olympic gold medalists for China
Table tennis players at the 2018 Summer Youth Olympics
21st-century Chinese people